

Quantum: Einstein, Bohr, and the Great Debate About the Nature of Reality is a science history book written by Manjit Kumar. It was released on October 16, 2008.

Overview
He describes Einstein, Bohr and the "Great Debate about the Nature of Reality" that played out over a number of years, particularly at the Fifth Solvay International Conference on electrons and photons in 1927, where the  physicists met to discuss the then newly formulated quantum theory. It narrates the life of some eminent physicists and their work and also gives a view of the  environment of science at that time. It tells the life stories of Bohr, Einstein, Planck, Rutherford, Schrödinger, and others.

Reception
Quantum was number 1 on the Hindustan Times top 10 science books you should read in 2012. 
Quantum had also been shortlisted for the BBC Samuel Johnson Prize for Non-Fiction, 2009.

See also 
 Bohr–Einstein debates
 EPR paradox

References

External links
Manjit Kumar's blog about his book Quantum

Books about the history of physics
Popular physics books